Zhang Yufei (born 19 April 1998) is a Chinese competitive swimmer who specializes in sprint freestyle and butterfly events. Considered one of the most promising swimmers in the international scene, she currently holds a world junior record in the 200 m butterfly, and also produced a tally of ten medals (five golds, three silver, and two bronze) in her swimming career, spanning the Youth Olympics, Asian Games, World Championships and the Summer Olympics.

Career
Born in Xuzhou (Jiangsu), Zhang began swimming at the age of three partly because of the encouragement and influence of her mother, who acted as her personal coach. Two years later, she started training professionally as a member of the Jiangsu Swimming Team, and eventually held numerous records for her age group. As more records followed, Zhang's rapid improvement culminated on her major debut in an international sporting event at the age of fourteen, when she beat 2008 Olympic champion Liu Zige for the gold medal in the 200 m butterfly at the 2012 FINA World Cup meet in Beijing. The following year, she was selected for the China's national swimming team.

Zhang's international debut came as a member of the host nation China at the 2014 Summer Youth Olympics in Nanjing, where she achieved a total of five medals: three golds and two silver. Zhang started off the competition with a powerful butterfly split of 58.56 in the girls' 4 × 100 m medley relay that tremendously helped her Chinese foursome break the junior world record (4:03.58) for the gold medal. On the same night, she managed a strong swim to take the silver in the 200 m butterfly with a time of 2:08.22, finishing farther behind Hungary's Liliána Szilágyi by less than two seconds. In the girls' 4 × 100 m freestyle relay, Zhang posted a third leg split in 54.09 until her host nation's foursome celebrated again with another relay victory in 3:41.19. On 22 August, Zhang relegated to her second silver in the 100 m butterfly at 57.95, narrowly losing the race again to Szilagyi by almost three tenths of a second. Despite missing out her first individual gold, Zhang and her teammates Li Guangyuan, He Yun, and Yu Hexin powered their stretch to grab another relay title for the Chinese squad in the mixed 4 × 100 m medley (3:49.33).

One month later, at the 2014 Asian Games in Incheon, South Korea, Zhang set a 54.10 split on the third leg to put the Chinese squad ahead to a marvelous victory in the women's 4 × 100 m freestyle relay, with a time of 3:37.25.

At the 2015 FINA World Championships in Kazan, Russia, Zhang swam her two finals on the fifth night of the competition with forty minutes in between. First, she lowered her own junior world record with 2:06.51 to take home her individual bronze in the 200 m butterfly. Forty minutes later, Zhang set a third leg split of 1:58.73 to deliver the Chinese foursome a bronze medal in the women's 4 × 200 m freestyle relay with a combined time of 7:49.10.

On 22 August 2018, Zhang won the Women's 200m butterfly gold medal at the 18th Asian Games in Jakarta, Indonesia with 2:06.61.

On 25 July 2021, Zhang went 55.64 to win silver in the Women's 100m butterfly at the 2020 Tokyo Olympics behind Maggie Macneil, who went 55.59.

On 28 July 2021, Zhang broke the Olympic record and the world record in the Women's 200m butterfly and the Women's 4x200 freestyle relay respectively, winning the gold medals in both events.

Personal bests

Long course (50-meter pool)

Short course (25-meter pool)

Key: NR = National Record ; AS = Asian Record ; OR = Olympic Record

See also
List of Youth Olympic Games gold medalists who won Olympic gold medals

References

External links
Nanjing 2014 Profile
 

 

 

 

1998 births
Living people
Asian Games gold medalists for China
Asian Games silver medalists for China
Asian Games medalists in swimming
Chinese female freestyle swimmers
Chinese female butterfly swimmers
Olympic swimmers of China
Medalists at the FINA World Swimming Championships (25 m)
Medalists at the 2014 Asian Games
Medalists at the 2018 Asian Games
Medalists at the 2020 Summer Olympics
Nanjing Sport Institute alumni
Olympic gold medalists for China
Olympic gold medalists in swimming
Olympic silver medalists for China
Olympic silver medalists in swimming
Swimmers at the 2014 Summer Youth Olympics
Swimmers at the 2014 Asian Games
Swimmers at the 2018 Asian Games
Swimmers at the 2016 Summer Olympics
Swimmers at the 2020 Summer Olympics
Sportspeople from Xuzhou
World Aquatics Championships medalists in swimming
Youth Olympic gold medalists for China